Sarsegaz (also Romanized as Sarsegāz) is a village in Ab Barik Rural District, in the Central District of Sonqor County, Kermanshah Province, Iran. At the 2006 census, its population was 430, with 105 families.

References 

Populated places in Sonqor County